Pathum Dilshan (born 20 June 1991) is a Sri Lankan cricketer. He made his first-class debut on 14 February 2020, for Sri Lanka Army Sports Club in the 2019–20 Premier League Tournament.

References

External links
 

1991 births
Living people
Sri Lankan cricketers
Sri Lanka Army Sports Club cricketers
Place of birth missing (living people)